Ali Kahrizi may refer to:
 Ali Kahrizi, Arshaq
 Ali Kahrizi, Moradlu